Koepcke's hairy-nosed bat (Mimon koepckeae) is a species of bat that is endemic to Peru.

References

Phyllostomidae
Mammals described in 1972
Bats of South America